Phi Persei (Phi Per, φ Persei, φ Per) is a Class B2Vpe fourth-magnitude star in the constellation Perseus, location about 720 light-years from Earth.

System

Phi Persei is spectroscopic binary consisting of a blue main sequence primary of class B2 and a hot subdwarf secondary. Phi Persei is a runaway star and extrapolating its space velocity backwards by the modelled age of the system (57 million years) places it within the Alpha Persei cluster.

The rapidly-spinning star is surrounded by a circumstellar disk. The binary orbit, the spin of the primary star, and the disk are all seen nearly edge-on. There are no eclipses, but models of the system show that the disk significantly obscures the primary star. The primary formed as a  star and has accreted material from its companion.

The secondary star is also a class O subdwarf, hotter than the primary but smaller and less massive.  It is proposed that it is the core of a  star, with the outer layers stripped as it expanded away from the main sequence.  Its luminosity is higher than expected for a normal  helium star, which suggests it may have evolved to helium shell burning.  Although the subdwarf has a bolometric luminosity about half that of the primary, it emots most of its radiation as ultraviolet, being only about 3% as bright as the primary at visible wavelengths.

Variability

Phi Persei is a variable star with both rapid and longterm variations in its brightness and spectrum.  Variations occur on a daily timescale which may be related to the rotation of the primary star.  Any variations originating with the secondary are difficult to detect due to its comparative faintness.  Slower variations, including deep fades, are also seen.  Some of the variations may correspond to the orbital period, possibly eclipses of gas streams or hot spots, but the occasional deep fades do not match any particular orbital phase.  The variations are classified as γ Cassiopeiae-type, shell stars with eruptions and irregular fading.

Naming
Flamsteed followed Ptolemy in treating φ Persei as being in Andromeda and gave it the designation 54 Andromedae. It is isolated from the main stars of Perseus, but lies within its formal borders.

References

External links
 HST Press release on the φ Per binary system

Persei, Phi
Perseus (constellation)
B-type main-sequence stars
08068
0496
010516
BD+49 0444
Gamma Cassiopeiae variable stars
Binary stars